This is a list of animated television series first aired in 2010.

See also
 List of animated feature films of 2010
 List of Japanese animation television series of 2010

References

Television series
Animated series
2010
2010
2010-related lists